Hallbergmoos station is a railway station on the Munich S-Bahn in the town of Hallbergmoos in the northeast area of Munich, Germany. It is served by the S-Bahn line .

References

Munich S-Bahn stations
Railway stations in Bavaria
Railway stations in Germany opened in 1992